Scream for Me Brazil is a live album by Bruce Dickinson, recorded in São Paulo, Brazil and released in 1999. The actual concert set list consisted of eighteen songs, but six of them were cut out from this release. The songs in question were three Iron Maiden songs; "Powerslave", "2 Minutes to Midnight" and "Flight of Icarus" as well as three of Dickinson's own songs; "Jerusalem", "Taking the Queen" and "Tattooed Millionaire". "Jerusalem" from this concert was later released on The Best of Bruce Dickinson compilation album in 2001.

Background
The album was released when guitarist Adrian Smith embodied his return to Iron Maiden and was considered a valuable conclusion of Dickinson's solo career. The first part of the concert consists entirely of the songs from the album The Chemical Wedding, and then the inevitable "Tears of the Dragon" begins to remake Dickinson's classics. The album does not include songs from Skunkworks and Tattooed Millionaire. The album received good reviews and recorded good sales, but there was no lack of innocent criticism over the lack of some songs and the possibility of not being used to release double CDs. It is known by several live forgery laws of the time, the most available being The "King in Crimson" comes recorded in Paris. After the "Darkside of Aquarius", there were Iron Maiden songs such as "Powerslave", "2 Minutes to Midnight", "Flight of Icarus", and "Tattooed Millier".

Track listing
All songs written by Bruce Dickinson and Roy Z, except where noted.

Personnel
Band members
 Bruce Dickinson - vocals
 Adrian Smith - guitar
 Roy Z - guitar, producer, engineer
 Eddie Casillas - bass
 David Ingraham - drums

Production
Stan Katayama - engineer

References

1999 live albums
Bruce Dickinson live albums
Sanctuary Records live albums
Albums produced by Roy Z